Jatropha integerrima, commonly known as peregrina or spicy jatropha, is a species of flowering plant in the spurge family, Euphorbiaceae, that is native to Cuba and Hispaniola.

References

External links

integerrima
Flora of Cuba
Flora of the Dominican Republic
Flora of Haiti
Plants described in 1760
Taxa named by Nikolaus Joseph von Jacquin
Flora without expected TNC conservation status